Rozniatow may refer to the following places in Europe:
Rozhniativ, Ukraine (southwestern Ukraine)
Rożniatów, Łódź Voivodeship (central Poland)
Rożniatów, Subcarpathian Voivodeship (south-east Poland)
Rożniątów, Opole Voivodeship (south-west Poland)